Tiaropsis is a genus of hydrozoans belonging to the family Tiaropsidae.

The species of this genus are found in Atlantic and Pacific Ocean.

Species:

Tiaropsis gordoni 
Tiaropsis multicirrata

References

Tiaropsidae
Hydrozoan genera